Suryaputra may refer to:

 Sunshine countries
 Suryaputra Karn